"Manslaughter" is a song by electronic music duo Lets Be Friends, consisting of English DJ and producer John Ford and Israeli electronic music producer Oren Emanuel. They self-released the song under their record label Unwanted on 17 January 2013. The song was released as part of the duo's debut extended play Lets Be Friends EP 1, released on 8 July 2013. The song's voice clips are sampled from a stand-up comedy routine by Brian Regan.

A VIP mix of the song was later released by Canadian record label Monstercat released it on 19 August 2013. The song was originally released as part of the compilation album Monstercat 014 – Discovery, released 2 September 2013. It was later featured as part of Monstercat's Best of 2013 compilation album, released on 19 December 2013.

Background and release
On 17 January 2013, the song was released as a digital download on international digital stores through Lets Be Friends' own record label Unwanted, as well as being released through various music streaming services. The song was released as part of Lets Be Friends' debut extended play Lets Be Friends EP 1, released on 8 July 2013.

On 19 August 2013, a VIP mix of the song was released through record label Monstercat. "Manslaughter" (VIP mix) was featured on the compilation album titled Monstercat 014 – Discovery released on 2 September 2013. The song was later featured on the yearly best-of compilation album titled Monstercat – Best of 2013 released on 19 December 2013. As of 15 June 2019, the VIP mix of the song has gained around 740,000 plays on SoundCloud and over 3,020,000 views on Monstercat's Uncaged YouTube channel.

Critical reception
"Manslaughter" was well received by most critics. While reviewing the extended play, Brett Edgerly of Your EDM touched on the song, calling it a "solid track fit for peak hours and is guaranteed to get the energy going with its unique namesake sampled intro" and reminiscent of English electronic music artist Far Too Loud. Writing for The Untz, Chris Schwarzkopf noted it as similar to "One Click Headshot" by British DJ Feed Me or as "IDGAFOS" by American DJ and record producer Dillon Francis, calling it the Tony Jaa of electronic dance music. EDM Sauce's Steven Jacobs wrote that the two producers "really hit it hard on this one" and called the drop "gory."

The VIP Mix was also fairly well received, with a Your EDM writer called the VIP mix just "as hard-hitting as the original while still sounding amazingly different." an EDMTunes writer also compared it to the original mix, writing that the" VIP mix takes it to the next level of bass madness" and that it is "definitely one of those tracks that you just can’t get out of your head."

Track listing

Release history

References

External links
 
 
 lyrics of this song at Genius

2013 singles
2013 songs
Monstercat singles
Electronic songs
House music songs
Electro house songs